Jackson Ramon Rivera (born 24 August 1959) is a Venezuelan boxer. He competed in the men's light middleweight event at the 1980 Summer Olympics. At the 1980 Summer Olympics, he defeated Roger Houangni of Benin, before losing to Wilson Kaoma of Zambia.

References

External links
 

1959 births
Living people
Venezuelan male boxers
Olympic boxers of Venezuela
Boxers at the 1980 Summer Olympics
Place of birth missing (living people)
Light-middleweight boxers